Double Live may refer to:
Double Live (Butthole Surfers album), a 1989 album by Butthole Surfers
Double Live (Rheostatics album), a 1997 album by Rheostatics
Double Live (Garth Brooks album) a 1998 live album by Garth Brooks
Double Live (Yngwie Malmsteen album), a 1998 album by Yngwie Malmsteen
Double Live (Starz album), a 2006 live album by Starz
Double Live Gonzo!, a 1978 album by Ted Nugent
Double Live (Clipping and Christopher Fleeger album), a 2020 live album by Clipping with Christopher Fleeger

See also
Double Life (disambiguation)